Kevin Robert Kaesviharn (born August 29, 1976) is a former American football safety. He was signed by the Iowa Barnstormers as a street free agent in 1998. He played college football at Augustana.

Kaesviharn was also a member of the San Francisco Demons, Green Bay Packers, Cincinnati Bengals, New Orleans Saints and Carolina Panthers.

Early years
He was born in Paramount, California. His father is an immigrant from Thailand. At Lakeville High School in Lakeville, Minnesota, Kaesviharn lettered in football, track, and basketball.

College career
Graduating in 1994, he attended Augustana College in Sioux Falls, South Dakota, an NCAA Division II school and was a three-year starter for the Vikings. He finished his collegiate career with 167 tackles, six interceptions, and 34 passes defensed.

As a freshman, Kaesviharn was credited with seven tackles (four solo) and one pass defense. In 1995, he started at cornerback, recording 45 tackles (29 solo), two interceptions, 10 passes defended and two fumble recoveries.

He had a stand out year in 1996, and was named an All-North Central Conference Second-team defensive back, picking up 47 tackles (26 solo), two interceptions and 11 passes defended.

Kaesviharn finished his collegiate career at cornerback in 1997 as a four-year letter winner. Shortly after his senior season he participated in the Division II All-Star game and was named First-team All-North Central Conference at cornerback, Academic All-North Central Conference, GTE Academic All-American District VII Second-team and Daktronics Division II All-Midwest Region Second-team. At season end, he was ranked third on the team with 68 tackles (44 of which were solo), and led the team with two interceptions and 12 pass breakups.

As a member of Augustana's Track and Field Program, he placed fourth in the triple jump and sixth in the long jump in the North Central Conference Outdoor Championships. Kaesviharn graduated with a degree in Mathematics and Physical Education.

Professional career

Iowa Barnstormers
After going undrafted in the 1998 NFL Draft, Kaesviharn spent one year out of football where he worked as a long term substitute teacher at Sioux Falls (SD) Washington High School, before signing with the Arena Football League's Iowa Barnstormers.

In 1999, Kaesviharn was named the Barnstormers' Rookie of the Year, leading the team with five interceptions for the season despite having played in only 10 games before breaking a bone in his foot.

His strong success continued into 2000, when Kaesviharn was named to the All-Arena First-team at Defensive Specialist, as the third player in AFL history to register more than 100 tackles in a single season. His 107 tackles were ranked second in the AFL overall. He set a Barnstormers record that year with 10 interceptions (for 81 yards) in one season.

In his two years with the Barnstormers, Kaesviharn recorded 133 tackles, 15 interceptions, 19 pass deflections, one fumble recovery, and caught six passes for 93 yards as a wide receiver.

San Francisco Demons
In 2000, Kaesviharn was drafted by the San Francisco Demons for the inaugural season of the XFL. Over the course of the season he was credited with 41 tackles (32 solo), three interceptions and three passes defended. He recorded 3 punt returns for a total of 25 yards (averaging 8.3 yards per carry). The Demons went 5-5 for the season, finishing second in their division and going on to the Million Dollar Game vs. the Los Angeles Xtreme. On April 21, 2001, the Xtreme defeated the Demons 38-6.

Green Bay Packers
In 2001, Kaesviharn started his NFL career signing as an undrafted free agent with the Green Bay Packers, but was waived just before their season opener.

Cincinnati Bengals
He was signed to the Cincinnati Bengals' squad four weeks later. During his stretch with the Bengals, Kaesviharn played in 87 games and logged 363 tackles (286 solo), six sacks, 15 interceptions, 28 passes defended and four fumble recoveries; one of which resulted in a touchdown when he returned the ball three yards on a Lee Suggs fumble in the second quarter vs. the Cleveland Browns on October 17, 2004. In 2006, he had his best year as a Bengal, despite only playing in 14 games, and starting in seven of them. Kaesviharn recorded six interceptions, along with four sacks for the season.

New Orleans Saints
On March 13, 2007, after five full seasons with the Bengals, Kaesviharn signed a four-year contract with the New Orleans Saints. He was released on March 26, 2009.

Carolina Panthers
Kaesviharn was signed by the Carolina Panthers on August 24, 2009 after safety Charles Godfrey underwent surgery on a broken hand. Wide receiver Jason Carter was waived to make room for Kaesviharn on the roster.

Tennessee Titans
Kaesviharn signed with the Tennessee Titans on September 29, 2009.

References

External links
Math teacher adding to Bengals lore
San Francisco Demons bio
Carolina Panthers bio 
Tennessee Titans bio

1976 births
Living people
Sportspeople from Los Angeles County, California
Players of American football from California
Players of American football from Minnesota
American football cornerbacks
American football safeties
Augustana (South Dakota) Vikings football players
Iowa Barnstormers players
San Francisco Demons players
Cincinnati Bengals players
New Orleans Saints players
Carolina Panthers players
Tennessee Titans players
American sportspeople of Thai descent
Green Bay Packers players
People from Paramount, California